Nagar (-nagar) can refer to:

Places

Bangladesh
Nagar, Rajshahi Division, a village
 Nagar, Barisal Division, a settlement

India
 Nagar taluka, Ahmednagar, Maharashtra State
 Nagar, Murshidabad, a village in West Bengal
 Nagar, Rajasthan, a town in Rajasthan
 Nagar, Uttar Pradesh, a pargana in Basti district

Iran
Nagar, Iran, a village in East Azerbaijan Province

Pakistan
The Nagar Valley in northern Pakistan
Nagar, Pakistan, a town
 Nagar District, an administrative unit
Nagar (princely state), a former autonomous princely state

Syria
Nagar, Syria (modern Tell Brak), an ancient city

Subcastes 
Nagar Brahmins, a subcaste in Hinduism

See also
 
 Naga (disambiguation)
 Nagara (disambiguation)
 Ellis Nagar